Ghanasyam Prabhu is an Indian cricket umpire. He has umpired 2 First-class, 8 women's one day and 8 women's Twenty20 matches.

Born in Thrissur, Kerala. Father Prabhu V P, mother Lizy Prabhu, wife Anjaly biju,Sister Meghana Prabhu.

Started school in St.Rock's L P school, then moved to St. Xavier's H S chevoor, finished Plus two, from St. Antony's H S ammadam. Degree in Physics from St. Thomas college, Thrissur. MBA from Kerala University.

joined Canara Bank in 2013, as single window operator. Resigned from Canara Bank in 2015.

Become BCCI national panel umpire in the year 2015. Ranji trophy debut in March 2022. Delhi vs chathisgarh match.

References 

Living people
Indian cricket umpires
Year of birth missing (living people)